Nell Steckel Steinmetz (born January 21, 1897) was a children's librarian.

Early life
Nell Steckel was born in New Jersey, on January 21, 1897, the daughter of Robert W. Steckel (1860-1955). The family moved to California in 1908 when she was 11 years old.

Career
Nell S. Steinmetz was a Children's librarian. For two and a half years she worked at the Tuolumne County Free Library, and was director of small community theatres and later she was Children's librarian at the Echo Park Branch of the Los Angeles Public Library.

She was a lecturer on children's literature.

In 1978 she was chairman of the 75th anniversary committee of the Coleman Chamber Music Association, the oldest series of chamber music concerts in the United States. Steinmetz was vicepresident of the Association at least since 1969.

Personal life
Nell S. Steinmetz had one son David Henry Steinmetz, III. She lived at 1086 Kensington Road, and later, in the 1940s, at 5341 Ellenwood Drive, Los Angeles, California.

She is buried at Forest Lawn Memorial Park (Glendale) along with her father.

References

1897 births
American librarians
American women librarians
People from Los Angeles
People from New Jersey
Year of death missing